Fritz Mast (16 February 1912 – 25 October 1976) was a Swiss weightlifter. He competed in the men's middleweight event at the 1948 Summer Olympics.

References

1912 births
1976 deaths
Swiss male weightlifters
Olympic weightlifters of Switzerland
Weightlifters at the 1948 Summer Olympics
Sportspeople from Kaliningrad